William Amorim Martins de Menezes (born 5 April 1989), known as William Menezes, is a Brazilian footballer who plays as a goalkeeper for Boavista.

References

External links

1989 births
Living people
Association football goalkeepers
Brazilian footballers
Campeonato Brasileiro Série A players
Campeonato Brasileiro Série B players
Cruzeiro Esporte Clube players
Esporte Clube Itaúna players
Esporte Clube Juventude players
Esporte Clube Santo André players
Boa Esporte Clube players
Esporte Clube Noroeste players
Esporte Clube Taubaté players
Coritiba Foot Ball Club players
Maringá Futebol Clube players
Oeste Futebol Clube players
Associação Atlética Anapolina players
Boavista F.C. players